George Edmond Finey (16 March 1895 – 8 June 1987) was an Australian black-and-white artist, noted for his unconventional appearance and left-wing politics.

He was born in Parnell, New Zealand. While working as an apprentice lithographer at the New Zealand Herald, he studied part-time at the Elam School of Art, sharing a studio with Unk White.

During World War I, Finey served in France with the New Zealand Army New Zealand Expeditionary Force as an under-age private, before being appointed as an official War Artist. After the war, he studied at the Regent Street Polytechnic School of Art in London and arrived in Sydney in 1919. In 1921, he was appointed by Alex Sass as a staff artist with Smith's Weekly.

Although he started with humorous sketches, it was for his caricatures that he became famous, initiating in Smith's Weekly a "Man of the Week". The first subject was Archbishop Mannix. He was sacked by Smith's Weekly after a legal tussle over ownership of works he had produced for the paper.

Finey worked for the Labor Daily for three months before being dropped for his antagonism towards Jack Lang, and then worked for Truth for a few years. He also worked for the Daily Telegraph, which he left in 1945 after he and Will Mahony refused to draw an anti-Labor cartoons, and the Militant Minority Movement paper, The Red Leader.

Finey also illustrated stories and articles appearing in the School Magazine published by the NSW Department of Education. The issues of June, August and September 1947 contain examples of his work.

He then turned to painting in an expressionistic style, and was possibly the first Australian painter to experiment with collage.
"Money for paints is scarce if you are living on the pension, and Finey creates constantly out of waste, scrap and natural materials.  He has made a whole series out of rolled-up, varnished newspapers, and he is adding to his History of Music with portraits of composers done in plastic foam, etched out with fine sandpaper. He uses rags, twine, shells, clay and stumps taken from the bush ..."
In 1978, he held a retrospective exhibition at the Sydney Opera House.

Finey was considered by Stan Cross to be the greatest of Australia's newspaper artists. George Blaikie remembered him as an unkempt long-haired sandal-wearing Bohemian, fearlessly honest in his work, and generous to a fault. He was an acknowledged influence on the work of Noel Counihan.

Finey was one of the 25 foundation members of the Black and White Artists' Society (later Club), and was prominent in its activities until shortly before he died.

Awards
Bathurst Prize for watercolour 1959

References

Art in Australia issue June 1924
Art in Australia issue June 1931

External links 
 Search for work by George Finey on DigitalNZ

Australian cartoonists
Australian caricaturists
1895 births
1987 deaths
20th-century Australian painters
20th-century New Zealand male artists
New Zealand cartoonists
Australian male painters
New Zealand military personnel of World War I
Child soldiers in World War I
New Zealand emigrants to Australia